Kiato is a town in the northern part of Corinthia in the Peloponnese, Greece. It is the seat of the municipality of Sikyona. Kiato is situated on the Gulf of Corinth, near the mouth of the river Asopos. It has much tourist activity mainly in the summer. The ancient city Sicyon was located 4 km southwest of present Kiato. Kiato is 4 km northwest of Velo, 13 km southeast of Xylokastro and 18 km northwest of Corinth. The Greek National Road 8A (Patras - Corinth - Athens) passes southwest of the town. It had a station on the now decommissioned Piraeus-Patras railway, and it is the western terminus of a Proastiakos (suburban railway) line to Athens. Public transit passengers traveling between Patras and Athens now switch between train and bus in Kiato.

Historical population

Notable people
Emilios T. Harlaftis (1965–2005), astrophysicist
Giannis Spanos (b. 1943-2019), composer
Alexandros Alexandris (b. 1968), footballer

See also
List of settlements in Corinthia

References

External links
Our Kiato
Kiato Remembered Thru Messages

Populated places in Corinthia